Curiglia con Monteviasco is a comune (municipality) in the Province of Varese in the Italian region Lombardy, located about  northwest of Milan and about  northwest of Varese in the Val Veddasca, on the border with Switzerland. The municipal seat is in Curiglia.

See also
Funivia di Monteviasco

References

Cities and towns in Lombardy